P2000 may stand for:
 P-2000 (album), a 2000 EP by black metal band Enthroned
 P2000 (network), a nationwide pager-network used by emergency services in the Netherlands
 Heckler & Koch P2000, a semi-automatic pistol manufactured by Heckler & Koch
 Philips P2000, a home computer that used to be made by Philips
 Archer-class patrol vessel, a class of Royal Navy patrol boat also known as the P2000 class
 Partnership 2000, a program connecting some 550 Jewish communities in the Diaspora with 45 Israel Partnership areas
 2000 United States presidential election
 Preservation 2000, a land conservation program in Florida that preceded Florida Forever
 Siemens P2000, a light rail vehicle for the Los Angeles Metro Rail